The Nissan Diesel Big Thumb is a heavy-duty commercial vehicle that was produced by the Japanese manufacturer  Nissan Diesel (now UD Trucks) and sold between 1990 and 2008. Unlike the successor to the Nissan Diesel C-series, the Big Thumb's size range was primarily available in other big-size trucks.

Most big-size models of the truck are distinguishable by a front 'Big Thumb' badge, but the common Nissan Diesel or UD badge is usually used on the rear.

The Big Thumb was facelifted in 2000 and 2002. The Big Thumb's principal competitors were the Mitsubishi Fuso Super Great, Isuzu Giga and Hino Profia. The Big Thumb has been succeeded by the Nissan Diesel Quon.

In Southeast Asia (Thailand, Malaysia, and Indonesia), a variant of truck is sold as Nissan Diesel Convoy/CWM series which uses Nissan Diesel Condor cabin but with mechanicals, engines, and drivelines from Nissan Diesel Big Thumb or Resona. CWM has been succeeded by UD Quester.

Lineup
CD : 6x2
CG : 8x4
NCK : 4x2
CW : 6x4
CV : 6x2 ( 2 Front Axle )
CF : 4x4
CZ : 6x6
CK-T : 4x2
CW-T : 6x4
CW-Z : 6x4
CW-X : 6x4
MK : 4x2
CKA : 6x4
CKB : 4x2
CDA : 6x2
CWB : 6x4
CGB : 8x4
CD450 : 8x4

Engine

References

External links

Nissan Diesel Big Thumb Homepage

Diesel Big Thumb
Cab over vehicles
UD trucks